Ghana competed in the 2014 Commonwealth Games in Glasgow, Scotland from 23 July – 3 August 2014.

Medalists

Athletics

Men
Track & road events

Field Events

Combined events – Decathlon

Women
Track & road events

Field Events

Key
Note–Ranks given for track events are within the athlete's heat only
Q = Qualified for the next round
q = Qualified for the next round as a fastest loser or, in field events, by position without achieving the qualifying target
NR = National record
N/A = Round not applicable for the event

Badminton

Mixed team

Pool B

Cycling

Track
Sprint

Time trial

Keirin

Judo

Men

Women

Swimming

Men

Women

Triathlon

Weightlifting

Men

Women

 Powerlifting

References

Nations at the 2014 Commonwealth Games
Ghana at the Commonwealth Games
2014 in Ghanaian sport